The Tipperary county hurling team represents Tipperary in hurling and is governed by Tipperary GAA, the county board of the Gaelic Athletic Association. The team competes in the three major annual inter-county competitions; the All-Ireland Senior Hurling Championship, the Munster Senior Hurling Championship and the National Hurling League.

Tipperary's home ground is Semple Stadium, Thurles. The team's manager is Liam Cahill.

The team last won the Munster Senior Championship in 2016, the All-Ireland Senior Championship in 2019 and the National League in 2008.

History

The teams of the Tipperary County Board, together with those of Kilkenny GAA and Cork GAA, lead the roll of honour in the All-Ireland Senior Hurling Championship (SHC). The Board's teams have won 28 All-Ireland SHC titles as of 2019 — the third most successful of all county boards. Three teams also have the distinction of twice winning three consecutive All-Ireland finals (1898, 1899, 1900) and (1949, 1950, 1951). The team of the 1960s is considered the greatest of all Tipperary teams. The county's fortunes declined during the latter half of the twentieth century to the extent that only seven All-Ireland SHC titles were won in the period 1966–2019; however, new systems and extensive work at underage level  brought SHC titles to Tipperary in 2010, 2016 and 2019, with old rival Kilkenny defeated in all three. As well as being victorious in four minor and three U21 All-Ireland hurling finals since 2006. For more detail on hurling history, see here.

Team sponsorship
Since 1991 the following companies have sponsored all of the Tipperary hurling teams.

1991–1997: Tipperary Water
1992–1994: National Irish Bank
1995–2001: Finches
2002–2011: Enfer Scientific
2011–2014: Škoda
2015–2018: Intersport/Elverys
2019–2021: Teneo
2022–: Fiserv

Support
There exists a supporters' club. According to Liam Kearns, this provides €100,000 in revenue annually for the hurling team. Babs Keating first established it in 1986 and it was the first such supporters' club in Gaelic games. By 2016, it had raised several million euro for the county hurling team.

Rivalries

In the All-Ireland series, Kilkenny are Tipp's main rivals. This rivalry has lasted since Kilkenny's coming to power in the early 20th century. Tipp are the only team to have beaten Kilkenny in the All-Ireland SHC (and also in All-Ireland SHC finals) more times than they have lost.

Another rival of Tipperary, in the Munster Senior Hurling Championship (SHC), is Cork. These teams have met 80 times in the championship, more than any other rivalry in hurling. They have also met them countless times in the National League and pre-season challenge tournaments. A Tipp and Cork Munster hurling final in Semple Stadium is often claimed by supporters of both counties to be the most traditional Munster final and the games between them are nearly always close. The draw and replay games of 1987 and 1991 and the 1949–1954 rivalry encapsulates this rivalry and the 1991 replayed final in Thurles is claimed to be one of the greatest Munster hurling finals. This is one of the few rivalries in the provincial championships that is contested by two teams of similar stature whose honours and titles complement each other on a fairly equal basis. Kilkenny and Wexford in hurling have major difference in titles and in football, Dublin and Meath also have a gap between their respective winnings. The football teams of Galway and Mayo enjoy a similar rivalry and whose honours are divided in equal measure.

Tipp also have a strong rivalry with the other county teams in Munster and have had major tussles with Limerick in the 1930s and 40s when the latter's star was in the ascendent, though Tipp enjoy a major advantage in titles and honours won. The Tipp – Clare rivalry came with Clare's coming to power in the 1990s and the Tipp-Waterford rivalry was forged in the period 1957-63 and renewed again due to Waterford's resurgence in the 2000s, when that county enjoyed its most successful period of the modern era.

Current panel

INJ Player has had an injury which has affected recent involvement with the county team.
RET Player has since retired from the county team.
RIP Player has since died.
WD Player has since withdrawn from the county team due to a non-injury issue.

Current management team
Appointed in July 2022:
Manager: Liam Cahill, appointed on a three-year term ahead of the 2023 season
Backroom team: Pádraic Maher (Thurles Sarsfields), Declan Laffan (Loughmore-Castleiney), T. J. Ryan (Clonoulty-Rossmore); all three appointed ahead of the 2023 season
Selectors: 
Coach: Michael Bevans, appointed ahead of the 2023 season
Strength and conditioning coach: 
Physio:

Managerial history

Tipperary — like Cork and Kilkenny — traditionally appoints managers from inside, rather than seeking a "foreign" appointment.

Players

Notable players

Captaincy

Historically, the captain of the Tipperary senior hurling team for each season was decided by the club that won the preceding Tipperary Senior Hurling Championship. For example, Willie Ryan was the team captain for 2009, as chosen by his club Toomevara. This system, however, meant there was little consistency from year to year and often meant that the team captain was not an integral part of the team or even a first choice player (as in the Willie Ryan example).

For the 2010 season, the responsibility for choosing the team captain was given to the county's management team. On 12 February 2010, it was announced that Eoin Kelly from the Mullinahone club would captain the county, with Declan Fanning acting as vice-captain. Eoin Kelly was again selected as captain for the 2011 season. Paul Curran was named as hurling captain in January 2012.

In February 2013, Shane McGrath was appointed captain for the 2013 season.

In October 2013, Brendan Maher was named as Tipperary captain for the 2014 season. Maher continued as captain for the 2015 and 2016 seasons.

In November 2016, it was announced that Pádraic Maher had been nominated as Tipperary hurling team captain for the 2017 season.

On 22 January 2019, Séamus Callanan was named as Tipperary hurling team captain for the 2019 season. He remained as captain for the 2020 and 2021 seasons.

On 5 February 2022, Ronan Maher was named as team captain for the 2022 season. The decision was made by a secret ballot vote from all members of the panel.
On 14 November 2022, Noel McGrath was named as the new Tipperary captain for the 2023 season.

Records

Most appearances

Top scorers

Most All-Ireland SHC medals

Cú Chulainn Awards

1963: John Doyle, Liam Devaney, Jimmy Doyle
1964: John Doyle2nd, Tony Wall, Mick Roche2nd, Theo English, Donie Nealon, Babs Keating, John "Mackey" McKenna, Jimmy Doyle2nd
1965: John O'Donoghue, Kieran Carey, Tony Wall2nd, Seán McLoughlin, Mick Roche3rd, Donie Nealon2nd, Jimmy Doyle3rd
1966: Theo English2nd, John "Mackey" McKenna2nd
1967: Mick Roche4th, Donie Nealon3rd, Len Gaynor, Babs Keating2nd

All Stars
Tipperary has 104 All Stars, as of 2019. 49 different players have won, as of 2019. Nicky English, Eoin Kelly and Pádraic Maher each won six All Stars. Tipperary players have received at least one All Star in 39 of the 50 years since the inauguration of the All Stars Awards Scheme.

1971: Tadhg O'Connor, Mick Roche, Francis Loughnane, Babs Keating
1972: Francis Loughnane2nd
1973: Francis Loughnane3rd
1975: Tadhg O'Connor2nd
1978: Thomas Butler
1979: Pat McLoughney, Tadgh O'Connor3rd
1980: Pat McLoughney2nd
1983: Nicky English
1984: Nicky English2nd
1985: Nicky English3rd
1986: Bobby Ryan
1987: Ken Hogan, Aidan Ryan, Pat Fox, Nicky English4th
1988: Bobby Ryan2nd, Colm Bonnar, Declan Ryan, Nicky English5th
1989: Conal Bonnar, Bobby Ryan3rd, Declan Carr, Pat Fox2nd, Cormac Bonnar, Nicky English6th
1990: Noel Sheehy, Michael Cleary
1991: Paul Delaney, Noel Sheehy2nd, Conal Bonnar2nd, John Leahy, Michael Cleary2nd, Pat Fox3rd, Cormac Bonnar2nd
1992: Michael Cleary3rd
1993: Michael Cleary4th
1994: John Leahy2nd
1996: Liam Cahill
1997: Paul Shelly, Tommy Dunne, Declan Ryan2nd, John Leahy3rd
1999: Tommy Dunne2nd
2000: Brendan Cummins, John Carroll
2001: Brendan Cummins2nd, Philip Maher, Eamonn Corcoran, Tommy Dunne3rd, Eddie Enright, Mark O'Leary, Eoin Kelly
2002: Paul Kelly, Eoin Kelly2nd
2003: Brendan Cummins3rd
2004: Eoin Kelly3rd
2005: Paul Kelly2nd, Eoin Kelly4th
2006: Eoin Kelly5th
2007: Declan Fanning
2008: Brendan Cummins4th, Conor O'Mahony, Shane McGrath
2009: Pádraic Maher, Conor O'Mahony2nd, Lar Corbett, Noel McGrath
2010: Brendan Cummins5th, Paul Curran, Brendan Maher, Noel McGrath2nd, Lar Corbett2nd, Eoin Kelly6th
2011: Paul Curran2nd, Michael Cahill, Pádraic Maher2nd, Lar Corbett3rd
2014: Darren Gleeson, Brendan Maher2nd, Pádraic Maher3rd, Shane McGrath2nd, John O'Dwyer, Patrick Maher, Séamus Callanan
2015: Séamus Callanan2nd
2016: Cathal Barrett, James Barry, Ronan Maher, Pádraic Maher4th, Patrick Maher2nd, Séamus Callanan3rd, John McGrath
2017: Pádraic Maher5th
2019: Brian Hogan, Cathal Barrett2nd, Ronan Maher2nd, Brendan Maher3rd, Pádraic Maher6th, Noel McGrath3rd, Séamus Callanan4th

Honours

National
All-Ireland Senior Hurling Championship
 Winners (28): 1887, 1895, 1896, 1898, 1899, 1900, 1906, 1908, 1916, 1925, 1930, 1937, 1945, 1949, 1950, 1951, 1958, 1961, 1962, 1964, 1965, 1971, 1989, 1991, 2001, 2010, 2016, 2019
 Runners-up (13): 1909, 1911, 1913, 1917, 1922, 1960, 1967, 1968, 1988, 1997, 2009, 2011, 2014
National Hurling League
 Winners (19): 1927–28, 1948–49, 1949–50, 1951–52, 1953–54, 1954–55, 1956–57, 1958–59, 1959–60, 1960–61, 1963–64, 1964–65, 1967–68, 1978–79, 1987–88, 1993–94, 1999, 2001, 2008
 Runners-up (20): 1930–31, 1937–38, 1939–40, 1947–48, 1952–53, 1955–56, 1962–63, 1965–66, 1970–71, 1974–75, 1988–89, 1991–92, 1995–96, 2000, 2003, 2009, 2013, 2014, 2017, 2018
All-Ireland Intermediate Hurling Championship
 Winners (7): 1963, 1966, 1971, 1972, 2000, 2012, 2013
All-Ireland Junior Hurling Championship
 Winners (9): 1913, 1915, 1924, 1926, 1930, 1933, 1953, 1989, 1991
All-Ireland Under-21 Hurling Championship
 Winners (11): 1964, 1967, 1979, 1980, 1981, 1985, 1989, 1995, 2010, 2018, 2019
All-Ireland Minor Hurling Championship
 Winners (21): 1930, 1932, 1933, 1934, 1947, 1949, 1952, 1953, 1955, 1956, 1957, 1959, 1976, 1980, 1982, 1996, 2006, 2007, 2012, 2016, 2022
All-Ireland Vocational Schools Championship
 Winners (14): 1962, 1964, 1965, 1966, 1967, 1968, 1969, 1974, 1978, 1988, 1990, 2004, 2010, 2011 (1962–1978 winners were North Tipperary)

Provincial
Munster Senior Hurling Championship
 Winners (42): 1895, 1896, 1898, 1899, 1900, 1906, 1908, 1909, 1913, 1916, 1917, 1922, 1924, 1925, 1930, 1937, 1941, 1945, 1949, 1950, 1951, 1958, 1960, 1961, 1962, 1964, 1965, 1967, 1968, 1971, 1987, 1988, 1989, 1991, 1993, 2001, 2008, 2009, 2011, 2012, 2015, 2016
 Runners-up (28): 1894, 1904, 1907, 1911, 1912, 1923, 1926, 1935, 1936, 1942, 1952, 1953, 1954, 1963, 1969, 1970, 1973, 1984, 1985, 1990, 1996, 1997, 2000, 2002, 2005, 2006, 2019, 2021
Waterford Crystal Cup
 Winners (4): 2007, 2008, 2012, 2014
Munster Intermediate Hurling Championship
 Winners (9): 1961, 1963, 1966, 1971, 1972, 2000, 2002, 2012, 2013
Munster Junior Hurling Championship
 Winners (16): 1910, 1911, 1913, 1915, 1924, 1926, 1928, 1930, 1933, 1951, 1953, 1985, 1988, 1989, 1990, 1991
Munster Under-21 Hurling Championship
 Winners (21): 1964, 1965, 1967, 1972, 1978, 1979, 1980, 1981, 1983, 1984, 1985, 1989, 1990, 1995, 1999, 2003, 2004, 2006, 2008, 2010, 2019
Munster Minor Hurling Championship 40
 Winners (41): 1930, 1931, 1932, 1933, 1934, 1935, 1945, 1946, 1947, 1949, 1950, 1952, 1953, 1954, 1955, 1956, 1957, 1959, 1960, 1961, 1962, 1973, 1976, 1980, 1982, 1983, 1987, 1991, 1993, 1996, 1997, 1999, 2001, 2002, 2003, 2007, 2012, 2015, 2016, 2018, 2022

References

 
County hurling teams